"Good to Be Me" is a song recorded by Uncle Kracker. It was released in 2010 as the second single from Kracker's album Happy Hour. The song was written by Matthew Shafer, Brett James, J. T. Harding and Robert J. Ritchie. The single version features Kracker's friend Kid Rock.

Critical reception
Giving it 3.5 stars out of 5, Bobby Peacock of Roughstock said that it was "laid back, happy and tuneful", and that it would "stand out" because of its rock sound.

Music video
The music video was directed by Christopher Sims and premiered in September 2010.

Chart performance
The song debuted at number 55 on the U.S. Billboard Hot Country Singles & Tracks chart for the week of July 31, 2010.

References

2010 singles
Uncle Kracker songs
Kid Rock songs
Male vocal duets
Songs written by Brett James
Song recordings produced by Rob Cavallo
Atlantic Records singles
Songs written by J. T. Harding
2009 songs
Songs written by Kid Rock
Songs written by Uncle Kracker